{{DISPLAYTITLE:C56H44O13}}
The molecular formula C56H44O13 (molar mass: 924.94 g/mol, exact mass: 924.278191 u) may refer to:

 Carasinol B, a stilbenoid  
 Kobophenol A, a stilbenoid 
 

Molecular formulas